Pigmy Love Circus is a Los Angeles rock band that has existed since the mid-1980s era of the Hollywood underground rock scene.

Pigmy Love Circus originally consisted of Shepherd Stevenson on bass, Mike Savage on vocals, Anthony Martinez (of Black Flag) on drums, with Rand "Pig" Walters and Peter Fletcher on guitars. Danny Carey, who already played in a number of other bands such as Green Jellÿ and Tool, played with them briefly in 1992, but left to focus on Tool.

By 1995, Pigmy Love Circus disbanded. What was left of the band went their separate ways. Savage went on to form 57 Crown and Big Ugly, both being formidable bands in Hollywood. Stevenson now acts and composes music for film. Fletcher moved to Denver, Colorado. Rand "Pig" Walters lives in South Carolina.

In 1999, Fletcher returned to Los Angeles and the flame was rekindled when Carey demanded a reunion.

The band toured several times in the U.S. in 2002–2004 both alone and also opening for A Perfect Circle in the U.S. and Canada.

In 2012, Pigmy Love Circus played a Dog Patch Wino Reunion show at the Dragonfly in Los Angeles. As of May 2020 this was their final appearance.

In 2014, Rand "Pig" Walters reappeared and released a solo record which is only currently available on his rawpork2014.com website.
It was recorded in Nashville and San Francisco, engineered, mixed and mastered by Mark Fuller.

Known for lively, confrontational concerts the band's music and primal energy incite fans to jump on stage (encouraged by the band) and sing along on songs such as "Dagwood Killed Blondie" and "Mad House Clown". The band achieved iconic status in the Los Angeles underground music scene.

Band members

Current members
Danny Carey (drums)
Peter Fletcher (guitar)
Michael Savage (vocals)
Shepherd Stevenson (bass)
John Ziegler (guitar)

Past members

Rand "Pig" Walters (guitar)
Anthony Martinez (drums)
Jeff Chambers (guitar)

Discography

EPs and singles 
 1989: I'm The King of L.A. ...I Killed Axl Rose Today
 1990: Beat on the Brat
 1992: Drink Free Forever
 1995: Drug Run to Fontana

Albums 
 1990: Live (live album)
 1991: Drink Free Forever 
 1992: When Clowns Become Kings
 2004: The Power of Beef

References

Rock music groups from California
Musical groups established in 1986
Hellhound Records artists